The 1900 Western Conference football season was the fifth season of college football played by the member schools of the Western Conference (later known as the Big Ten Conference) and was a part of the 1900 college football season.  This was the first season the league expanded, as Indiana and Iowa began competing for the conference title.

The 1900 Minnesota Golden Gophers and Iowa Hawkeyes football teams tied for the conference championship. Minnesota, under head coach Henry L. Williams, compiled a 10–0–2 record, shut out nine opponents, and outscored all opponents by a combined total of 299 to 23.  Iowa, under head coach Alden Knipe, compiled a 7–0–1 record and led the conference in scoring offense with an average of 38.9 points per game. The 1900 Wisconsin Badgers, under head coach Philip King, placed third in the conference, compiled an 8–1 record (its only loss being to Minnesota by a 7–6 score), shut out seven of nine opponents, and led the conference in scoring defense with an average of 1.2 points allowed per game.

Season overview

Results and team statistics

Key

PPG = Average of points scored per game
PAG = Average of points allowed per game

Regular season
The following conference games were played during the 1900 Western Conference season:
 October 6: Chicago defeated Purdue, 17–5, at Chicago
 October 13: Minnesota tied Chicago, 6–6, at Minneapolis
 October 13: Northwestern defeated Indiana, 12–0, at Evanston, Illinois
 October 20: Michigan defeated Purdue, 11–6, at Ann Arbor, Michigan
 October 20: Northwestern tied Illinois, 0–0, at Evanston, Illinois
 October 27: Michigan defeated Illinois, 12–0, at Chicago
 November 2: Iowa defeated Chicago, 17–0, at Chicago
 November 3: Minnesota defeated Wisconsin, 6–5, at Minneapolis
 November 3: Michigan defeated Indiana, 12–0, at Ann Arbor, Michigan
 November 3: Iowa defeated Chicago, 17–0, at Chicago
 November 3: Illinois defeated Purdue, 17–5, at Champaign, Illinois
 November 10: Minnesota defeated Illinois, 23–0, at Minneapolis
 November 10: Iowa defeated Michigan, 28–5, at Detroit
 November 10: Northwestern defeated Chicago, 5–0, at Chicago
 November 17: Minnesota defeated Northwestern, 21–0, at Minneapolis
 November 17: Wisconsin defeated Chicago, 39–5, at Chicago
 November 24: Wisconsin defeated Illinois, 27–0, at Madison, Wisconsin
 November 27: Indiana tied Illinois, 0–0, at Indianapolis
 November 28: Chicago defeated Michigan, 15–6, at Chicago
 November 29: Iowa tied Northwestern, 5–5, at Rock Island, Illinois
 November 29: Indiana defeated Purdue, 24–5, at West Lafayette, Indiana

Notable non-conference games during the 1900 season included the following:
 October 6: Minnesota defeated Iowa State, 27–0, at Minneapolis
 October 20: Chicago lost to Brown, 11–6, at Chicago
 October 25: Indiana defeated Notre Dame, 6–0, at Bloomington, Indiana
 October 26: Iowa defeated Drake, 26–0, at Iowa City, Iowa
 October 27: Minnesota defeated North Dakota, 34–0, at Minneapolis
 October 27: Chicago lost to Penn, 41–0, at Philadelphia
 November 10: Wisconsin defeated Notre Dame, 54–0, at Madison, Wisconsin
 November 17: Michigan defeated Notre Dame, 7–0, at Ann Arbor, Michigan
 November 24: Michigan tied Ohio State, 0–0, at Ann Arbor, Michigan
 November 29: Minnesota defeated Nebraska, 20–12, at Lincoln, Nebraska

Bowl games
No bowl games were played during the 1900 season.

Awards and honors

All-Western players

In 1900, an All-Western football team was selected by Caspar Whitney (CW) in Outing magazine as follows:

All-Americans

No Western Conference players received first-team All-America honors in 1900.  However, two players received third-team honors on Walter Camp's All-America team for 1900.  They were center Page of Minnesota and quarterback Clyde Williams of Iowa.

References